The Apostolic Nunciature to Kazakhstan is an ecclesiastical office of the Catholic Church in Kazakhstan. It is a diplomatic post of the Holy See, whose representative is called the Apostolic Nuncio with the rank of an ambassador.

Its office is located in Astana, Kazakhstan.

List of papal representatives to Kazakhstan 
Apostolic Nuncios 
Marian Oleś (9 April 1994 – 11 December 2001)
Józef Wesołowski (6 November 2002 – 24 January 2008)
Miguel Maury Buendía (19 May 2008 - 5 December 2015)
Francis Assisi Chullikatt (30 April 2016 – 01 October 2022)

References

Kazakhstan
Diplomatic missions in Kazakhstan
 
Holy See–Kazakhstan relations